The Ahnapee Brewery building is located in Algoma, Wisconsin.

History
The building served as a brewery until 1890. It went on to be used as a warehouse, a fly net factory, a washing machine factory and a feed storage facility. Currently, it serves as a winery. The building was added to the State and the National Register of Historic Places in 1994.

In 2013 Ahnapee Brewery was re-imagined & reopened in a two-stall-garage-turned-taproom, two doors down from the original 1800s brewery location on Navarino St.  In 2022 the taproom moved from Navarino St. to the corner of Clark St. & 2nd Street in Algoma.  In 2020 Ahnapee Brewery opened a second location in Suamico, WI which houses all of the brewery's production and another taproom.

References

Industrial buildings and structures on the National Register of Historic Places in Wisconsin
Warehouses on the National Register of Historic Places
National Register of Historic Places in Kewaunee County, Wisconsin
Wineries of the United States
Mid 19th Century Revival architecture in the United States
Brick buildings and structures
Food and drink companies based in Wisconsin